Linda Ruth Bravo Sarmiento (born 6 March 1992), known as Ruth Bravo, is an Argentine footballer who plays as a midfielder for Liga MX Femenil club León. Nicknamed Chule, she represents the Argentina women's national team.

International career
Bravo scored one goal at the 2018 Copa América Femenina.

International goals
Scores and results list Argentina's goal tally first

Personal life
Bravo was raised in Magdalena, Buenos Aires Province.

References

External links
 
 
 
 

1992 births
Living people
People from Salta
Sportspeople from Buenos Aires Province
Argentine women's footballers
Women's association football midfielders
Estudiantes de La Plata footballers
Boca Juniors (women) footballers
Real Madrid Femenino players
Rayo Vallecano Femenino players
C.F. Pachuca (women) footballers
Primera División (women) players
Argentina women's international footballers
2019 FIFA Women's World Cup players
Argentine expatriate women's footballers
Argentine expatriate sportspeople in Spain
Expatriate women's footballers in Spain
Argentine expatriate sportspeople in Mexico
Expatriate women's footballers in Mexico